The Firm Gets Married is a 1931 German musical comedy film directed by Carl Wilhelm and starring Ralph Arthur Roberts, Charlotte Ander, and Oskar Karlweis. It is a remake of a 1914 silent comedy The Firm Gets Married starring Ernst Lubitsch.

The film's art direction was by Ernő Metzner.

Cast

References

Bibliography

External links 
 

1931 films
Films of the Weimar Republic
German musical comedy films
1931 musical comedy films
1930s German-language films
Films directed by Carl Wilhelm
Sound film remakes of silent films
Remakes of German films
Terra Film films
1930s German films